Nesthäkchen's First School Year is the second book in the Nesthäkchen series, written by Else Ury. Nesthäkchen is a Berlin doctor's daughter, Anne Marie Braun, a slim, golden blond, quintessential German girl. The series follows Annemarie from infancy (Nesthäkchen and Her Dolls) to old age and grandchildren (Nesthäkchen with White Hair).

Nesthäkchen's First School Year, published in Berlin 1915 by Meidingers Jugendschriften Verlag, describes Annemarie's first school year.

Plot summary

In the first class, which is the tenth in the old count, are fifty pupils. The class teacher is an attractive, sympathetic lady, Miss Hering. Anne Marie makes friends with the neighbor's daughter, Margot Thielen, and two cousins, Marlene Ulrich and Ilse Hermann. Also Anne Marie is attracted to the naughty Hilde Rabe. 
The book describes the school day in the German Empire. In class a hierarchy is introduced. The best students are in front, the bad ones sit in back. 
Anne Marie is a good student, but she does not remain long in first place. Not only her performance but also her behavior and orderliness are graded. Anne Marie is soon surpassed by her friend Margot Thielen, who is less talented but a good child. In the editions of the book prior to the 1980s, Anne Marie's mother explains to her daughter that orderliness and behavior are more important than good grades for a girl. However, Anne Marie persists in her untidiness until she forgets one day to give her canary Mätzchen (Antics) fresh water. The bird dies, and Anne Marie feels for the first time that sloppiness can have dire consequences. She gets a new bird for Christmas, whom she believes is her old bird born again. She becomes - at least until the end of the book - an orderly child and is permitted to give a children's party as a reward. 
The difficult art of knitting Anne Marie learns from her grandmother. During the summer holidays she travels with her parents to Johannesbad (Janské Lázně) in the Riesengebirge (the venue of the holiday was not changed after 1945).

Critical reception
"A young family favorite charms her teacher in this affecting novel from a century ago. Readers should be transported not only to an earlier era’s childhood world, but to a glowingly idealized version of that realm, and they will likely be as enchanted by Annemarie as were Ury’s original readers." Kirkus Reviews

Genre

The Nesthäkchen books represent a German literary genre, the Backfischroman, a girls' novel that describes maturation and was intended for readers 12 – 16 years old. A Backfisch (“teenage girl”, literally “fish for frying”) is a young girl between fourteen and seventeen years of age. The Backfischroman was in fashion between 1850 and 1950. It dealt overwhelmingly with stereotypes, traditional social images of growing girls absorbing societal norms. The stories ended in marriage, with the heroine becoming a Hausfrau. Among the most successful Backfischroman authors, beside Else Ury, were Magda Trott, Emmy von Rhoden with her Der Trotzkopf and Henny Koch. Ury intended to end the Nesthäkchen series with volume 6, Nesthäkchen Flies From the Nest, describing Nesthäkchen's marriage. Meidingers Jugendschriften Verlag, her Berlin publisher, was inundated with a flood of letters from Ury's young fans, begging for more Nesthäkchen stories. After some hesitation, Ury wrote four more Nesthäkchen volumes, and included comments about her initial doubts in an epilogue to volume 7, Nesthäkchen and Her Chicks.

Author
Else Ury (November 1, 1877 in Berlin; January 13, 1943 in the Auschwitz concentration camp) was a German writer and children's book author. Her best-known character is the blonde doctor's daughter Annemarie Braun, whose life from childhood to old age is told in the ten volumes of the highly successful Nesthäkchen series. The books, the six-part TV series Nesthäkchen (1983), based on the first three volumes, as well as the new DVD edition (2005) caught the attention of millions of readers and viewers.

References

German children's literature
Fictional German people
German books
Child characters in literature
Children's fiction books
1915 children's books